Adanan bin Yusof (born 7 December 1952), sometimes referred to as Pehin Dato Adanan, is a Bruneian politician who served as Minister of Home Affairs (MOHA) from 2005 to 2010, and as Minister of Health from 2010 to 2015, and a current member of the Brunei Legislative Council.

Biogaphy

Early life and education 
Adanan is born on 7 December 1952, in Kampong Tamoi. He was educated at the University of East Anglia (BA).

Career 
Early in Adanan's career, he was appointed several positions which include the Economic Development Board Project Officer (1978–1981); Administrative Officer 1, Public Service Department (1981–1982); Administrative Officer 1, Corruption Prevention Bureau Department (1982–1984); Special Level Administrative Officer, Ministry of Internal Affairs (KHEDN) (1984–1986); KHEDN Senior Administrative Officer (1987–1992); Director of Immigration and National Registration (1993–1997); KHEDN Permanent Secretary and Director of Immigration and National Registration (1 October 1997–12 July 1999); Permanent Secretary in the Prime Minister's Office (13 July 1999–8 August 2002); Deputy Minister of Internal Affairs (9 August 2002– 23 May 2005); Deputy Minister of Internal Affairs as Director of Internal Security (26 May 2003–23 May 2005).

On 24 May 2005, Adanan was appointed as the 3rd Minister of Home Affairs, in which he would hold until 28 May 2010. Six days later, all cabinet ministers were summoned by Sultan Hassanal Bolkiah to take the oath at Istana Nurul Iman. He emphasized the need of youth involvement in making festivities associated with the Monarch's 59th birthday celebrations successful in order to foster undivided allegiance to the monarch and patriotism for the nation, during the launch of the Juara Gemilang Seni (JGS) Carnival on 23 July 2005. Following the receipt in Geneva of a letter from Adanan, stating on behalf of the Government that Brunei formally accepts the obligations of the ILO Constitution, Brunei has become the 180th Member State of the International Labour Organization (ILO). The accession of Brunei Darussalam took place on 17 January 2007.

Adanan was reappointed as the Minister of Health on 29 May 2010, and on 9 June, all newly appointed ministers including him was again summoned by the Sultan for an oath taking ceremony. From 24 to 28 September 2012, he attended the WHO Western Pacific Regional Committee Meeting's 63rd session in Vietnam. On 28 May 2013, the Singapore-Brunei Memorandum of Understanding (MoU) on Health Cooperation was extended today at a signing ceremony held in the Empire Hotel and Country Club by Minister for Health Gan Kim Yong and Adanan Yusof. The extension of this Memorandum of Understanding demonstrates the determination of both nations to continue and broaden already-existing, mutually beneficial areas of cooperation. A titah made by the Sultan on 21 October 2015, announces that he would be succeeded by Zulkarnain Hanafi. 

After obtaining consent from Sultan Hassanal Bolkiah on 20 January 2023, he was again appointed for the second time as a member of the LegCo.

Other appointments 
He held several other key positions such as being a Member of the Royal Council; Member of the National Assembly; Chairman of the National Committee for the Celebration of the Birthday of His Majesty the Sultan and Yang Di-Pertuan of Brunei Darussalam; Chairman of the Bandar Seri Begawan Municipal Planning and Development Committee; Chairman of the Management Board of Mukim and Village Consultation Council; Chairman of the Committee to Address Unemployment Issues; Chairman of the Committee to Appoint Consultants at the Ministry of Internal Affairs for the National Development Plan Project (RKN); Deputy Chairman (Permanent) of the National Disaster Council; Member of the National Council on Social Issues; Patron of the Temburong District Flood Relief Fund (February 2008); Co-Patron of the Brunei and Muara District Wind Victims Relief Fund Committee (May 2008); Joint Advisor to the Flood and Landslide Relief Fund Committee (January–February 2009).

Honours 
Adanan was bestowed the title of Yang Berhormat (The Honorable) Pehin Orang Kaya Johan Pahlawan on 24 April 2004. Examples of honours given to him;

  Order of Setia Negara Brunei First Class (PSNB) – Dato Setia (15 July 2006)
  Order of Seri Paduka Mahkota Brunei Second Class (DPMB) – Dato Paduka
  Meritorious Service Medal (PJK)
  Service to State Medal (PIKB)
  Long Service Medal (PKL)
  Proclamation of Independence Medal – (1 January 1984)
  National Day Silver Jubilee Medal – (23 February 2009)

References

1952 births
Living people
Alumni of the University of East Anglia
Health ministers of Brunei
Interior ministers of Brunei
Members of the Legislative Council of Brunei